Kadlín is a municipality and village in Mělník District in the Central Bohemian Region of the Czech Republic. It has about 100 inhabitants.

Administrative parts
The village of Ledce is an administrative part of Kadlín.

Etymology
The name was probably derived from tkáti, tkadlec, i.e. "to weave, weaver". It was probably originally a weavers' settlement.

Geography

History

The first written mention of Kadlín is from 1346. Among the notable owners of the village were Hynek Berka of Dubá, Augustinian monastery in Bělá pod Bezdězem, or Rudolf II. In 1445, the territory of the village was divided, and until 1849 the two parts were administered separately and had different owners.

Sights
The landmark of Kadlín is the Church of Saint James the Great. It was first mentioned in 1384.

The local municipal museum focuses on rural themes and includes an exhibition with rural technology, blacksmith's work, a collection of hoes and local field crops.

On Hradiště hill there is an observation tower.

References

External links

Villages in Mělník District